David Reginald Cournooh (born 28 July 1990) is a Ghanaian-Italian professional basketball player for Pallacanestro Brescia of Lega Basket Serie A.

Professional career
In June 2016, he signed a two-year contract with The Flexx Pistoia. 

On 13 January 2017, Cournooh parted ways with The Flexx Pistoia and signed with the Pallacanestro Cantù.

On 30 June 2018, Corunooh signed with Virtus Bologna.

On 4 August 2020, Cournooh signed with Vanoli Cremona.

On June 27, 2022, he has signed with Pallacanestro Brescia of Lega Basket Serie A.

National team career
Because of the unavailability of a Ghanaian national basketball team, Cournooh has been a member of the Italian national basketball team.

Honours and titles

Club
Montepaschi Siena
Italian Supercup: 2013
Virtus Bologna
Basketball Champions League: 2018–19

References

External links
 Interperformances profile
 Eurobasket.com profile
 basketball-reference.com profile

1990 births
Living people
A.S. Junior Pallacanestro Casale players
Andrea Costa Imola players
Ghanaian men's basketball players
Italian men's basketball players
Italian people of Ghanaian descent
Italian sportspeople of African descent
Lega Basket Serie A players
Mens Sana Basket players
New Basket Brindisi players
Pallacanestro Cantù players
Pistoia Basket 2000 players
Place of birth missing (living people)
Point guards
Shooting guards
Vanoli Cremona players
Virtus Bologna players